Amalie is a feminine given name. It is a German variant of the name Amalia. It is derived from the root word 'amal', meaning 'work' in German, 'hope' in Arabic and 'water' in Scots-Gaelic. 

Notable people with the name include:

 Cristiane Luise Amalie Becker (1778–1797), German actress
 Amalie Benjamin (born 1982), American sportswriter
 Amalie Sara Colquhoun (1894-1974), Australian landscape and portrait painter
 Amalie Dietrich (1821–1891), German naturalist
 Amalie Grøn Hansen (born 1996), Danish handballer
 Amalie Hofer (1820–1872), German revolutionary
 Amalie Kass (born 1928), American historian
 Amalie Konsa (1873–1949), Estonian actress
 Amalie Malling (born 1948), Danish classical pianist
 Amalie Nacken (1855–1940 Munich), German philanthropist
 Amalie "Emmy" Noether (1882–1935), German mathematician
 Lisbeth Cathrine Amalie Rose (1738–1793), Danish actress
 Amalie Schoppe (1791–1858), German writer
 Klara Amalie Skoglund (1891–1978), Norwegian politician
 Amalie Skram (1846–1905), Norwegian author and feminist
 Amalie Wichmann (born 1995), Danish handball player
 Amalie Winter (born 1803), German writer

Nobility and royalty

 Archduchess Amalie Theresa of Austria (1807), daughter of Francis II, Holy Roman Emperor
 Amalie Auguste of Bavaria (1801–1877), Princess of Bavaria and Queen of Saxony
 Sophie Amalie of Brunswick-Lüneburg (1628–1685), queen-consort of Denmark and Norway
 Duchess Louise Amalie of Brunswick-Wolfenbüttel (1722–1780), daughter of Ferdinand Albert II, Duke of Brunswick-Lüneburg
 Frederikke Amalie of Denmark (1649–1704), duchess of Holstein-Gottorp
 Landgravine Amalie of Hesse-Darmstadt (1754–1832), daughter of Ludwig IX, Landgrave of Hesse-Darmstadt and Henriette Karoline of Palatine-Zweibrücken
 Landgravine Elisabeth Amalie of Hesse-Darmstadt (1635–1709), Electress Palatine
 Charlotte Amalie of Hesse-Kassel (or Hesse-Cassel) (1650–1714), Danish queen consort
 Sophie Amalie Moth (1654–1719), countess of Samsø
 Amalie Zephyrine of Salm-Kyrburg (1760–1841), German princess
 Amalie, Princess of Saxony (1794–1870), German composer and Princess of Saxony
 Amalie von Wallmoden, Countess of Yarmouth (1704–1765), mistress of George II of Great Britain

See also
 Amalie (disambiguation)
 Amélie (given name)
 Amalia (given name)

German feminine given names
Feminine given names